Sally of the Subway is a 1932 American pre-Code crime film directed by George B. Seitz and starring Jack Mulhall, Dorothy Revier and Blanche Mehaffey. It was produced as a second feature for release by Mayfair Pictures.

Plot
A gang of jewel thieves use an exiled member of German royalty as an unwitting part of their scheme to rob a major New York jewellery company. Fortunately he is tipped off by one of the store's workers and he is able to turn the tables on the gang.

Cast
 Jack Mulhall as Ludwig
 Dorothy Revier as Sally
 Blanche Mehaffey as Angela
 Huntley Gordon as Gordon
 Harry Semels as Von Trump
 Crauford Kent as Moffit
 John Webb Dillion as McMillan, Henchman
 William P. Burt as Scraggs, Henchman
 George 'Gabby' Hayes as Police Lieutenant Paxton
 Ellinor Vanderveer as Mrs. Stubbs
 Bob Reeves as Bill, Police Officer
 Julia Griffith as 	Miss Duncan, Credit Manager

References

Bibliography
 Pitts, Michael R. Poverty Row Studios, 1929–1940: An Illustrated History of 55 Independent Film Companies, with a Filmography for Each. McFarland & Company, 2005.

External links

1932 films
1932 crime films
American crime films
American black-and-white films
Films directed by George B. Seitz
1930s English-language films
1930s American films
English-language crime films